The Racecourse Ground is a football stadium in Wrexham, Wales. It is the home of Wrexham A.F.C.

It is the world's oldest international football stadium that still hosts international matches, having hosted Wales' first  home international match in 1877, and has hosted more Wales international matches than any other ground. The record attendance at the ground was set in 1957, when Wrexham hosted a match against Manchester United in front of 34,445 spectators.

The Racecourse Ground is the largest stadium in north Wales and the fifth largest in Wales. The ground is sometimes used by the Football Association of Wales for home international games. The ground has also been used by North Wales Crusaders rugby league club, Scarlets rugby union club and  Liverpool Reserves. In the early days, the ground was used for cricket and horse racing. Concerts returned to the Racecourse in 2016 when Stereophonics performed.

History
Wrexham Football Club have played at the Racecourse Ground since being formed in the local Turf Hotel public house in October 1864. However, Wrexham played their home games in the 1881–82 and 1882–83 seasons at the Recreation Ground in Rhosddu due to an increase in rent from the then owners, Wrexham Cricket Club, while also changing the name to Wrexham Athletic for one season. Before the club was formed the ground was mainly used for cricket and occasionally, horse racing. The Racecourse was used extensively for flying before the First World War, with Gustav Hamel making public displays in August 1912 and June 1913. Wrexham Borough Council considered making the racecourse the town's municipal airport, however this was later developed at Borras. 

1952 saw the laying down of concrete terracing on the ever-popular Kop end, which is now the oldest part of the ground. Five years later was to see the largest ever attendance at the Racecourse when 34,445 people gathered to witness an FA Cup fourth-round tie against Manchester United. On 30 September 1959, the Racecourse saw the switching-on of the newly installed floodlights.

After promotion to the old Second Division in 1978 the Border Stand was built, taking its name from the Border Breweries which owned the ground. This part of the ground is now known as the Eric Roberts Builders Stand, where visiting supporters are normally seated.

The latest addition to the ground was achieved in 1999 after Grant Aid from Sport Lot, the Welsh Development Agency and the Football Trust together with local sponsorship allowed for the construction of a new stand on the Mold Road side of the ground. The new structure was originally named the Pryce Griffiths Stand after the then chairman (but since renamed the Mold Road Stand after the then chairman sold the club to Alex Hamilton) has a capacity of 3,500 and also contains hospitality and conferencing facilities.

The development also saw the Paddock areas of the Sainsbury's Stand and the Eric Roberts Builders Stand become all-seated, bringing the current capacity up to 15,500 and thus allowing international football and rugby union to once again be played at the Racecourse.

In 2002 then Wrexham F.C. chairman William Pryce Griffiths secured a 125-year lease on the Racecourse with Wolverhampton Dudley Breweries for £750,000, and a peppercorn annual rent of £1. The club hosted TNS vs Liverpool in a UEFA Champions League qualifier in 2005.

On 26 June 2002, the freehold to the Racecourse Ground was acquired by Wrexham A.F.C. from Wolverhampton Dudley Breweries for £300,000. On the same day, the ownership of the freehold was transferred by the chairman, Alex Hamilton, from Wrexham A.F.C. to another of his companies, Damens Ltd, for a nominal fee. After this controversial change in ownership, the 125-year lease on the Racecourse held by Wrexham F.C. was renegotiated. The new lease stated that Damens Ltd could evict Wrexham F.C. from the Racecourse Ground upon 12 months' notice and payment of £1,000,000. The new lease also saw the club's annual rent increase from £1 to £30,000. In 2004 Wrexham F.C. was given a years' notice to quit the ground; this triggered a furious reaction from fans – in a legal case running through to March 2006 the High Court ruled that the ownership of the freehold of the ground had been improperly transferred, and ownership of the ground reverted to the club's then-administrators (the club having gone into administration in December 2004 with debts of £2,600,000).

On 19 May 2014, work began at the Racecourse; which included a new pitch and sprinkler system, and changing rooms for players and officials. The medical and treatment facilities were also upgraded, together with improved seating for disabled supporters, better floodlighting and removal of cambers at the ‘Kop’ end of the ground. The results mean the stadium has been reclassified to Category 3 level, meaning it is able to host international football matches.

Wrexham Village Ltd
With the club's emergence from Administration in May 2006, ownership of the ground passed new company, Wrexham Football Club (2006) Ltd, owned by Geoff Moss and Ian Roberts. They passed ownership of the football ground to a new holding company Wrexham Village Ltd, which owned both the new football club company, and later purchased the rugby league club Crusaders from its owners in Bridgend, South Wales. Thus the new company had two tenants for the stadium.

To put a permanent cash injection into the sporting clubs, Wrexham Village proposed in 2008 a joint venture development with a yet to be chosen third party, to develop a student village area near the site of the KOP stand. The £40 million project would be developed in conjunction with Glyndŵr University to house over 800 students, and take place in two phases. The club would benefit from either land-lease income, or joint ownership within the development and hence rental income direct from the tenants. However, due to the global recession, the company found it hard to find a development partner, and the land and project was eventually sold freehold in 2009 to another company owned by Moss and Roberts.

In August 2011, after a period of instability at Wrexham Village Ltd, the owning company of the stadium and both the football and rugby league clubs, the company agreed to sell the stadium and associated training grounds to Glyndŵr University. The proposed deal, subject to completion and contract under the financial terms agreed by both parties, will allow both sporting teams to continue using the facilities. The purchase of the ground also resulted in the re-branding of the stadium, incorporating the university's name.

University and later club ownership
In August 2016 Wrexham Glyndwr University and Wrexham A.F.C. signed a contract that signalled a new future for the Racecourse. The lease from the university was branded as "My Racecourse".

The university, which purchased the landmark in 2011, saving it from possible extinction, handed operational control of the ground over to the football club as part a 99-year lease. After the takeover by Ryan Reynolds and Rob McElhenney, the club began talks with Wrexham Glyndwr University to purchase the freehold of the ground.  On 29 June 2022, the club purchased the freehold of the stadium from the university.

Stadium for the North Bid
In 2022 Wrexham Council began a bid for 'levelling up' funding, a UK Government aiming to increase public investment outside of south-east England. The funding would be made available to the construction of a new Kop stand, improved media, broadcast, and floodlight facilities, a car park, and ground works for a convention centre and hotel. These upgrades would allow for a return of competitive Wales national football fixtures. Former Wales footballers Mickey Thomas and Malcolm Allen served as figureheads for the bid.

Stadium details

Stands
The Kop: the all-standing home stand is named after the Battle of Spion Kop, as many grounds in the UK used to have ends named similarly. Behind the goal, it is known officially as the Crispin Lane End or "Town End". With a capacity of 5,000, the Spion Kop was the largest all-standing terrace in the English Football League. Since 2008, it has been unused on safety grounds. In November 2022, Wrexham Council's planning committee approved plans for a 5,500 capacity seater stand including a hospitality lounge, office and retail space for the club as well as further facilities for the club's community trust.

Wrexham Lager Stand, capacity 4,200, backing onto where Yale College used to be. It was built in 1972 in preparation for the club's first venture into Europe, and also provided new dressing rooms, club offices and entertainment suites. The Centenary Club is also located here. The stand is officially sponsored by Wrexham Lager (Now a locally owned independent brewery). The club held a lottery during the 2009–10 season with the winner getting to name the stand for a season. The winning ticket resulted in the stand being called the Loyal Canadian Red Stand. For the 2010–11 season it has been renamed the Cash4Gold Stand.

Wrexrent Stand: formerly the Marston's Stand/Tech End. It holds 2,800 spectators and provides the supporters with excellent views of the pitch and excellent acoustics. From the 2007–08 season home fans will be located in this stand and away fans moved to the wing of the Yale Stand, with the exception of games where a large away attendance is anticipated.

Macron Stand: the newest stand, capacity 3,500, was secured with lottery funding, and built over the old Mold Road stand in 1999. The stand possesses a TV studio and eight fully equipped private boxes, and has a restaurant called "The Changing Rooms"; there is also a club shop which is run by the Supporters' Trust adjacent to the stand. The stand was initially named after the chairman Pryce Griffiths, but was renamed as the Mold Road Stand, following Pryce Griffith's endorsement of Alex Hamilton's redevelopment scheme. A family area, sponsored by Nando's was introduced in the 2009–10 season, located to the area of the stand nearest to the Kop. For the 2010–11 season, as part of the Crusaders presence, the stand was renamed the Greene King Stand

Disabled facilities

Wrexham have 38 disabled places available at the front of the Mold Road Stand. There are 22 parking spaces in the Glyndwr University car park (next door) also two disabled toilets are available, plus low-counter refreshment kiosks, with steward assistance if required. Admission is £12 for disabled supporters (£5 concessions) and helpers are admitted free of charge.

The stadium has eight allocated spaces for those who are visually impaired; the commentary provided is also broadcast to the local hospital.

In October 2013, the stadium hosted the United Kingdom's first 'autism friendly' football match. A group of around 50 attended the Racecourse to watch the Reds play against Woking.

In August 2015, a new viewing platform was opened by Lord Faulkner of Worcester, using funding from the Premier League's Football Stadia Improvement Fund. Located at the rear of the Mold Road Stand, this further increased the number of places available to disabled fans, as well as providing protection from the elements. It has space for six users and carers.

After the platform was opened, Baroness Tanni Grey-Thompson praised the club in the House of Lords, saying "This is a club, my Lords, that genuinely cares about its spectators. My Lords, the big clubs are hiding."

At the beginning of the 2018–19 season it was announced that the Racecourse is now autism friendly, for every home game each season, with allocated seating in a quieter area of the stadium (if required) and the club also providing ear defenders and a quiet hub to use if required and a dedicated steward who is on hand to help.

The club became the first in Wales to win an autism-friendly award in 2018, which was awarded by the National Autistic Society.

In January 2018, Wrexham Football Club hired Kerry Evans, its first disability liaison officer.

In November 2018, the DSA started the Audio Descriptive Commentary service, where blind or visually impaired supporters can listen to the game, live in the stadium. There are 10 handsets available, on a first come first served basis.

Rugby League

Domestic
The ground was home to former Super League club Crusaders RL from 2010 after their departure from Brewery Field in Bridgend in South Wales.  Crusaders were hoping to play at Rodney Parade in Newport but the deal fell through; they then decided to move to North Wales and a new franchise was created.

Crusaders have enjoyed some well-attended games at the Racecourse Ground during 2010 with their opening engage Super League match against Leeds attracted over 10,000 people, with large local support.

In 2011 Crusaders withdraw their Super League licence application and ultimately folded citing financial invalidity.

2012 saw the birth of a new club, born from the ashes of the old club. North Wales Crusaders currently play in the Co-operative Championship 1 competition. They are seen as a separate entity from the former club, and are starting their own chapter in rugby league history. From 2016, North Wales Crusaders no longer play at the Racecourse Ground.

International
International Rugby League games have also been staged at the ground. The stadium hosted Wales' clash with England in the 2012 Autumn International Series. In 2013, it held Wales' 2013 Rugby League World Cup home game with the USA on Sunday 3 November 2013, with the Tomahawks ending the home side's chance of a quarter-final appearance with a 24–16 win. The win by the USA, a team expected to be easily beaten in their first ever Rugby League World Cup, would see them return to Wrexham for a quarter-final clash against tournament favourites Australia, on Saturday 16 November 2013. As expected, the Kangaroos (who would go on to win the World Cup) defeated the USA 62–0, with 5,762 in attendance.

As part of the 2014 Rugby League European Cup, the Racecourse Ground hosted the match between Wales and Ireland on 2 November.

As of 2015, the Racecourse Ground has hosted nine Wales internationals. The results were as follows:

Rugby Union internationals

The Racecourse Ground has held four rugby union internationals. Three of them were Wales’ friendlies against Romania and won all three of them (70–21 30 August 1997, 40–3 on 3 October 1999 and 54–8 on 27 August 2003 which was a warm-up game before the 2003 Rugby World Cup. It also hosted a 1999 Rugby Union World Cup Pool 4 match between Japan and Samoa on 3 October 1999 with Samoa winning 43–9. The Racecourse has also played host to the Wales 'A' squad on numerous occasions.

Other uses

The first concert held at the stadium was held in July 1982. Motörhead headlined, with support from Twisted Sister, making their first UK appearance. Other concerts at the venue have included Stereophonics, as part of their Keep The Summer Alive tour, UB40 and Olly Murs. Kings of Leon will perform two shows at the stadium in the May of 2023.

The stadium was used as a filming location in the 2015 television film Marvellous about the life of Neil Baldwin.

Location
The ground is located on Mold Road close to the A483 dual carriageway. Wrexham General railway station is adjacent to the ground.

Attendances
The five biggest attendances for Wrexham matches at the Racecourse have been:

References

Football venues in Wales
Welsh Cup final venues
Rugby union stadiums in Wales
Rugby league stadiums in Wales
Rugby League World Cup stadiums
Rugby World Cup stadiums
Wrexham
Stadiums in Wrexham
Wrexham A.F.C.
Crusaders Rugby League
Sport in Wrexham County Borough
North Wales Crusaders
Sports venues completed in 1864
English Football League venues
1864 establishments in Wales